The Three Poles is an adventurer’s challenge to reach the North Pole, the South Pole, and the summit of Mount Everest.

The first person to reach all three locations was Edmund Hillary. He reached the top of Everest in May 1953, summited the South Pole in January 1958, and made it to the North Pole in company with Neil Armstrong in April 1985.
 
Hillary flew to the North Pole. The first person to reach all three locations on foot was Erling Kagge. He completed the Three Poles Challenge by May 1994, six months faster than the next person. On 5 August 1997, Antoine de Choudens (France, 1969–2009) became the only climber to accomplish the Three Poles Challenge on foot without using supplementary oxygen on the Everest climb. Tina Sjögren became the first woman to complete the challenge in 2002.

Colin O'Brady became the fastest person to complete the Three Poles Challenge in May 2016, setting the current record in 131 days as part of his successful attempt to break the Seven Summits and Explorers Grand Slam (Last Degree) speed records. However, unlike Erling Kagge, Antoine de Choudens, and Tina Sjögren, Colin O’Brady only did the Last Degree of the North Pole.

Masha Gordon became the fastest woman to complete the Three Poles Challenge in 2016, beating a record set by Wang Lei in May 2010.

See also 
 Eight-thousander
 Mountaineers 5 Peak Pin
 Seven Second Summits
 Volcanic Seven Summits
 Four Poles Challenge

References

External links

Peak bagging
Polar regions of the Earth
Edmund Hillary
Mountaineering competitions